Blackguard is an old-fashioned term for a scoundrel. Blackguard or Black Guard(s) may refer to:

 Black Guard, a corps of Black African soldiers in Morocco
 Black Guard (Brazil), a militia of former slaves intended to protect the monarchy
 Black Guard (Philippine Revolutionary Army), see Luna Sharpshooters
 Black Guards, armed anarchist groups formed after the Russian Revolution
 Blackguard (band), a death metal band
 The Blackguard (novel), a 1923 novel by Raymond Paton
 The Blackguard, 1925 film based on the novel
 Blackguards, a 2014 video game from Daedalic Entertainment
 Black Band (landsknechts), also called Black Guards, mercenary army in Germany created 1514
 Blackguard, a character in the DC comics crime group 100
 Blackguard, a Fender Telecaster, Broadcaster, or Nocaster guitar made roughly between 1950 and 1954

See also
Black Army (disambiguation)
Black Company
Black Hundreds
Black Watch (disambiguation)